Franne Lee is an American costume designer for stage and film. She is the former wife of stage scenic designer Eugene Lee. She has won multiple Tony Awards and Drama Desk Awards.

External links
 
 
 Franne Lee papers and designs, 1969-1997, held by the Billy Rose Theatre Division, New York Public Library for the Performing Arts

Year of birth missing (living people)
Living people
American costume designers
Drama Desk Award winners
Tony Award winners